On 26 April 2019, Sri Lankan security forces and National Thowheeth Jama'ath militants linked to the Islamic State of Iraq and the Levant clashed when the security forces raided a house in the town of Sainthamaruthu in Ampara District at around 7:30 pm. The house had been used by the militants to manufacture explosives and suicide vests. Three suicide bombers blew themselves up, killing nine of their family members, including six children, while four other suspects where shot dead by the soldiers. A civilian was killed and two others were injured during the crossfire.

Background 
Following the 2019 Sri Lanka Easter bombings, the Sri Lankan government initiated an operation to locate suspected ISIL-loyal National Thowheeth Jama'ath terrorists. Special Task Force received a tip from a traffic police officer about a house in Sainthamaruthu with a group of suspicious people. The Special Task Force went onto raid the house under suspicion. The ISIL-aligned Amaq News Agency later claimed that the National Thowheeth Jama'ath militants of Sainthamaruthu had prepared an ambush at the house, and had voluntarily lured the security forces into attacking them.

Attacks 
When the Special Task Force tried to enter the house shots were fired from inside. The security forces exchanged fire with those inside the house for about an hour. Three suicide bombers blew themselves up killing 9 people, while police confirmed three other suspects were killed in the engagement. 

Three women and six children were killed in the suicide bombings by the terrorists. A civilian was killed in crossfire.

Those killed in the raid were identified as Zahran Hashim's father Mohamed Hashim and his brothers Zainee and Rilwan, with Rilwan being one of the suicide bombers. The Amaq News Agency released a statement claiming that the militants at Sainthamaruthu had been loyal to ISIL, and that they had managed to kill 17 Sri Lankan security forces. It also published a photo of Zahran alongside his brother Rilwan. The family released a final video message before being killed, which suggested that they had indeed been linked to ISIL.

Aftermath 
Fifteen bodies were initially recovered from the site of the clash. Security troops also recovered explosives, detonators, gelignite sticks, acid bottles, detonating cords, ISIL flags, suicide kits, and military uniforms. A woman and a child injured at a nearby house during the explosions were taken to the hospital and received police custody, suspected to be the wife and daughter of Zahran. 

A curfew was imposed in the area till further notice.

The bodies of 10 adults were buried without religious rites on 2 May but the 6 children were buried with Islamic funeral rites. However, the bodies were exhumed on June to collect DNA samples as the previous samples were too contaminated.

The Sri Lankan Police awarded රු.500,000 ($) to the police officer who tipped off the Special Task Force about the safe house in Sainthamaruthu. Three Muslim citizens in the area who tipped off the police about the suspects will be given රු.1 million ($) each.

References 

2019 Sri Lanka Easter bombings
2019 murders in Sri Lanka
21st-century mass murder in Sri Lanka
April 2019 crimes in Asia
Attacks on buildings and structures in Sri Lanka
Crime in Eastern Province, Sri Lanka
History of Ampara District
Islamic terrorism in Sri Lanka
Islamic terrorist incidents in 2019
Mass murder in 2019
Military operations involving Sri Lanka
Terrorist incidents in Sri Lanka in 2019
2019 in Sri Lanka
2019 disasters in Sri Lanka